Lars Cramer (born 25 May 1991) is a retired Norwegian footballer who played as a goalkeeper.

Career
Cramer spent the 2010 season with Asker on loan. He was also loaned out to Asker in the 2011 season and played 17 matches for the club in the First Division. Strømsgodset used their option to recall Cramer in August 2011, and he made his debut in Eliteserien against Odd Grenland on 2 October 2011, when Adam Larsen Kwarasey was benched by head coach Ronny Deila.

Cramer has represented Norway at youth level, and played two matches for the under-19 team in 2010, one match for the under-21 team in 2011 and one match for the Norway national under-23 football team|under-23 team in 2012.

Cramer retired from professional football when his contract with Aalesund ran out after the 2016-season, to focus on a medical degree at the University of Bergen. On September 6, 2017, however, he signed a short-term contract with SK Brann as they were in dire need of goalkeepers for the remainder of the 2017 season.

References

1991 births
Living people
Sportspeople from Drammen
Norwegian footballers
Norway under-21 international footballers
Norway youth international footballers
Association football goalkeepers
Strømsgodset Toppfotball players
Asker Fotball players
Kalmar FF players
Aalesunds FK players
SK Brann players
Norwegian First Division players
Allsvenskan players
Eliteserien players
Norwegian expatriate footballers
Expatriate footballers in Sweden
Norwegian expatriate sportspeople in Sweden